The Ministry of Health and Population (MoHP) is a governmental body of Nepal in charge of regulating the healthcare system and its implementation. The ministry's tasks are manifold and include managing the development of the healthcare in Nepal, overseeing population policies, planning and implementation and overseeing non-governmental associated with health services in Nepal.

Health care facilities 
The Ministry of Health and Population runs and oversees all public hospitals in Nepal. These include four Regional Hospitals, 11 Zonal Hospitals, five Teaching hospitals, as well as district hospitals and general hospitals.

Organisational structure
The Department of Health Services serves under the ministry to facilitate and implement its work, mainly deliver health services and to maintain public hospitals.
Furthermore, two other departments also work under and with the ministry:
 Department of Ayurveda
 Department of Drug Administration (established 1979)

Former ministers of Health and Population
This is a list of former ministers of the Ministry of Health and Population since the Nepalese Constituent Assembly election in 2013. The name/portfolio of the ministry was adjusted several times, as the term population was dropped from the official name from 2015 to 2018.

See also
 Health in Nepal

Notes

References

Health and Population
Nepal